The Notations are an American soul group formed at high school in Chicago, Illinois in the late 1960s .

Career
The group recorded for Tad Records early in their career; at a point in their career, Syl Johnson brought The Notations to Twinight (Based in Chicago). 
The 1st million dollar seller was a song produced by Syl Johnson entitled "I'm Still Here". The follow-up single to that was a song entitled "At The Crossroads" written by group member James Stroud. The original members were Clifford Curry, Lasalle Matthews, & James Stroud.  The group stayed with Twilight Records until the doors closed.

In 1973 the group joined Curtom / Gemigo Records, a label owned and ran by Curtis Mayfield.
The new lineup of the group consisted of Clifford Curry, Lasalle Matthews, Bobby Thomas & Walter Jones. They charted a song entitled "It Only Hurts For a Little While" written by Howard Sanderford. There were some other follow-up songs: It's Alright, This Feeling (written by Chuck Jackson & Marvin Yancy). Also, there was a cut that charted on the Disco Side entitled "Think Before You Stop". There was a song that did very well overseas entitled "SuperPeople". The group stayed there until the doors closed in 1979.

Emmmett Garnder (The group's manager at the time) took the group to Mercury Records with a song entitled "Judy Blue Eyes". They stayed with the label for one year.

Current Members are Clifford Curry, Eric Rapier Bryant & Marzette Griffith.
They have a new single entitled "Just Your Love".
This particular track was produced by Aundre Miller & Jimmy Hudson.

The Notations just signed a lucrative recording contract with Silent Giant Entertainment in Sherman Oaks, California. (2019)

They have new videos and a couple of EP's of some Old School Classics: "Daddy's Home", "Be Thankful", "I'm So Proud", "I'm Your Puppet", "Sitting in The Park", "I'll Always Love You", "In The Morning"...

Discography

Albums
The Notations (Gemigo Records / Curtom Records , 1975)
Super People (Sequel Records, 1999; compilation)

Singles

References

External links
 The Notations on Twinight Records

American soul musical groups
Musical groups from Chicago